Spencer Community School District is a public school district headquartered in Spencer, Iowa.

The district, entirely in Clay County, serves Spencer, Dickens, Gillett Grove, and a small part of Fostoria.

On July 1, 2010, the South Clay Community School District dissolved, with a portion going to the Spencer district.

Schools

 Spencer High School(9th-12th)

 Spencer Middle School(6th-8th)

 Lincoln Elementary(3rd-5th)

 Fairveiw Elementary(1st-2nd)

 Johnson Elementary (Preschool, KinderKids, & Kindergarten)
 It formerly operated Jefferson Elementary School.

The school's mascot is the Tigers. Their colors are purple and gold.

Spencer High School

Extracurricular activities
FFA (Advisor Mrs.Renee Huckfelt)

Band (Concert Band, Pep Band, and Marching Band) 

Choir 

Drama 

Speech 

Debate 

Mock Trail

Athletics
The Tigers compete in the Lakes Conference in the following sports:

Baseball
 2-time Class 3A State Champions (1990, 1997)
Basketball (boys and girls)
Cross Country (boys and girls)
 Girls' - 1978 Class 3A State Champions
Football
 1994 Class 3A State Champions
Golf (boys and girls)
Soccer (boys and girls)
 Boys' - 2009 Class 2A State Champions
Softball (girls)
Swimming (boys and girls)
Tennis (boys and girls)
Track and Field (boys and girls)
 Boys' 3-time Class 3A State Champions (1987, 1988, 2002)
Volleyball (girls)
Wrestling

See also
List of school districts in Iowa
List of high schools in Iowa

References

External links
Spencer Community School District

School districts in Iowa
Education in Clay County, Iowa